A lunula (plural: lunulae) was a crescent moon shaped pendant worn by girls in ancient Rome. Girls ideally wore them as an apotropaic amulet, the equivalent of the boy's bulla. In the popular belief the Romans wore amulets usually as a talisman, to protect themselves against evil forces, demons and sorcery, but especially against the evil eye.

In Plautus' play, Epidicus asks the young girl Telestis: "Don't you remember my bringing you a gold lunula on your birthday, and a little gold ring for your finger?" An explicit definition is provided by Isidore of Seville: "Lunulae are female ornaments in the likeness of the moon, little hanging gold bullae." But in Plautus' play Rudens, Palaestra says her father gave her a golden bulla on the day of her birth.

See also
 Gold lunula

References

 
 

Ancient Roman culture
Amulets
Necklaces